The English rock band Def Leppard have released twelve studio albums, two live albums, four compilation albums, and three extended plays.

Def Leppard was formed in 1977 by vocalist Joe Elliott, bass player Rick "Sav" Savage, guitarist Pete Willis, and drummer Tony Kenning. They later released the EP The Def Leppard E.P. in 1979. The band signed with Mercury Records and released their debut full-length album On Through the Night. The band's follow up was High 'n' Dry, which reached number 26 in the UK and was certified platinum two times in the United States. Their next album, titled Pyromania, would be their big breakthrough album and would later sell more than 10 million copies in the United States alone.

After touring in support of Pyromania, the band released Hysteria which topped the American and British album charts and is their best-selling album worldwide, selling more than 12 million copies in the United States alone and over 25 million worldwide. Adrenalize, released in 1992, debuted at number one on the UK Album Chart and the US Billboard 200 and launched several successful singles, including "Let's Get Rocked" and "Make Love Like a Man" and went on to sell 8 million albums worldwide. In 1996, the band released its sixth studio album, Slang; while successful, the album could not reach the precedent set by Def Leppard's previous albums and was certified gold in the United States. After three years, Def Leppard released Euphoria, which is the band's last certified album by the RIAA, CRIA, and BPI.

At the start of the 21st century, the band released X. Four years later, Def Leppard released the studio/cover album, Yeah!, which included covers by Thin Lizzy and The Kinks. On 25 April 2008, the band released Songs from the Sparkle Lounge, which included the single "Nine Lives" featuring country singer Tim McGraw. The band released Mirrorball, its first live album, in 2011, which would be followed by another live album in 2013, Viva! Hysteria, featuring the Hysteria album played live in its entirety, from their Las Vegas residency at the Hard Rock Hotel. The band released a self-titled studio album on 30 October 2015. Seven years later, on 27 May 2022, Def Leppard released Diamond Star Halos.

In January 2022, it was announced that Primary Wave Music had acquired  an “additional” stake in Def Leppard's music publishing catalog, as well as the band's master royalty income stream.

Albums

Studio albums

Compilation albums

Live albums

Deluxe editions and box sets

† CD version only, all of the tracks on Rarities Volume Four are included in the vinyl version of Rarities Volume Three.

Extended plays

Singles

1979–1989

1992–2000

2002–2022

Videos

Music videos

Personnel

See also
List of glam metal albums and songs

References

Discography
Heavy metal group discographies
Discographies of British artists